Xanthophyllum velutinum is a tree in the family Polygalaceae. The specific epithet  is from the Latin meaning "velvety", referring to the twig and leaf undersides.

Description
The smooth bark is grey or pale brown. The flowers are yellow or white, drying brownish orange.

Distribution and habitat
Xanthophyllum velutinum is endemic to Borneo. Its habitat is mixed dipterocarp, old secondary, riverine or lower montane forests from sea-level to  altitude.

References

velutinum
Endemic flora of Borneo
Trees of Borneo
Plants described in 1896